Damien Ryan (born 20 September 1979) is an Australian professional basketball player.

Born in Gisborne, Victoria, Ryan attended Salesian College in Sunbury, Victoria.

After starring as a junior basketballer in Sunbury, he attended the Australian Institute of Sport in 1997. Ryan began his NBL career with the Canberra Cannons for the 1998/1999 season and he won the Rookie of the Year award for that season.  After only one more season with the Cannons, Ryan signed on to play for the Brisbane Bullets in 2000. Ryan continued with the Bullets for a further two seasons, included a stellar season in 2002/2003 where he averaged 18.62 ppg .

After this stint with the Bullets, Ryan left Australia to compete in Serie A basketball league in Italy. He initially played for Avellino from 2004 to 2005 and then played for Teramo in 2006.  During his time in Italy, Ryan was named in the Australian national men's team, the Boomers, in 2005 and 2006.

In late 2006, Ryan returned to Australia and was signed by the Perth Wildcats to replace injured guard Adam Caporn.  His signing was a significant boost to the Wildcats lineup as Ryan provided excellent performances coming off the bench.  Ryan has been named as a free agent after the completion of the 2006/07 season. For the 2007/08 season he has signed with the Italian LegADue (second division) team Vanoli Soresina. In August 2008 moved to Aurora Basket Jesi, in the same League.

In 2010, Ryan will return to the Australian NBL with the Sydney Kings.

In January 2011 he signed with Cimberio Varese.

References 

1979 births
Living people
Australian men's basketball players
Australian Institute of Sport basketball players
Brisbane Bullets players
Canberra Cannons players
Perth Wildcats players
Point guards
Shooting guards
Sydney Kings players
Vanoli Cremona players
Sportsmen from Victoria (Australia)
People from Gisborne, Victoria
Teramo Basket players
S.S. Felice Scandone players
Aurora Basket Jesi players
Pallacanestro Varese players
Australian expatriate basketball people in Italy
People educated at Salesian College (Rupertswood)